The Sri Lanka women's cricket team played the Australia women's cricket team in September and October 2019. The tour consisted of three Women's One Day Internationals (WODIs), which formed part of the 2017–20 ICC Women's Championship, and three Women's Twenty20 International (WT20I) matches. It was the first bilateral series played by Sri Lanka Women in Australia.

In the third and final WT20I match of the series, Australia's Alyssa Healy set a new record for the highest individual score in a Women's T20I match, with 148 not out. Australia won the WT20I series 3–0. Australia won the first two WODI matches to take an unassailable lead in the series. Their win in the second match was their 17th win in WODIs in a row, which equalled the record for most consecutive wins in the format. The victory also confirmed Australia as the winners of the 2017–20 ICC Women's Championship. Australia went on to win the third WODI by nine wickets, winning the series 3–0, and setting a new record for the most consecutive wins in WODIs, with 18.

Squads

Tour match

20-over match: Cricket Australia XI vs Sri Lanka

WT20I series

1st WT20I

2nd WT20I

3rd WT20I

WODI series

1st WODI

2nd WODI

3rd WODI

References

External links
 Series home at ESPN Cricinfo

2017–20 ICC Women's Championship
2019 in Australian cricket
2019 in Sri Lankan cricket
2019 in women's cricket
2019–20 Australian women's cricket season
International cricket competitions in 2019–20
Australia 2019-30
Sri Lanka 2019-20